GLD may refer to:

Organisations
 German Labour Delegation, an American exile organization
 Government Legal Department of the United Kingdom
 Government Logistics Department of Hong Kong
 People's Liberation Army General Logistics Department, China

Other
 Global Lexicostatistical Database, a linguistics database
 Global Love Day, mainly in the United States 
 Goodland Municipal Airport, in Kansas, United States
 Guildford (Surrey) railway station in  England
 Nanai language, spoken in Russia and China (ISO 639 code gld)
 SPDR Gold Shares, an exchange-traded fund